Anthrax lethal factor endopeptidase (lethal toxin) is an enzyme that catalyzes the hydrolysis of mitogen-activated protein kinase kinases.  This enzyme is a component of the lethal factor produced by the bacterium Bacillus anthracis. The preferred cleavage site can be denoted by BBBBxHxH, in which B denotes a basic amino acid Arg or Lys, H denotes a hydrophobic amino acid, and x is any amino acid.

References 

EC 3.4.24